Jeřice is a municipality and village in Jičín District in the Hradec Králové Region of the Czech Republic. It has about 400 inhabitants.

Administrative parts
The village of Dolní Černůtky is an administrative part of Jeřice.

References

Villages in Jičín District